The Irish Environmental Network (IEN) is a network of environmental Non-Government Organisations (NGOs) that was established in 2002. The network is designed to give greater reach and access to funding for disparate and sometimes small member organisations. The IEN also has the Environmental Pillar which acts as a lobbying group with many of the same NGOs in order to present their concerns to government and policy matters at all levels, national, regional and local. The IEN has also coordinated a photography awards scheme, and manages the Green News website which covers a range of environmental news stories in Ireland and abroad.

Members 
Members of the Irish Environmental Network include:
 An Taisce, The National Trust for Ireland
 Bat Conservation Ireland
 BirdWatch Ireland
 CELT
 Cloughjordan EcoVillage
 Coomhola Salmon Trust
 Coastwatch
 ECO-UNESCO
 Feasta
 Forest Friends
 Friends of the Earth
 Friends of the Irish Environment
 Global Action Plan
 Gluaiseacht
 Good Energies Alliance Ireland
 Green Foundation Ireland
 Hedge Laying Association of Ireland
 Green Economy Foundation
 Irish Peatland Conservation Council
 Irish Wildlife Trust
 Irish Seed Savers Association
 Irish Whale and Dolphin Group
 Just Forests
 Native Woodland Trust
 Sonairte
 Sustainable Ireland Cooperative (Cultivate)
 The Organic Centre
 The Vincent Wildlife Trust
 VOICE
 Zero Waste Alliance Ireland

References

External links

 

Environmental organisations based in Ireland
Conservation in the Republic of Ireland
2002 establishments in Ireland
Organizations established in 2002